Hydrocoryne is a genus of cnidarians belonging to the family Hydrocorynidae.

The species of this genus are found in Japan and Northern America.

Species:

Hydrocoryne bodegensis 
Hydrocoryne condensa 
Hydrocoryne iemanja 
Hydrocoryne longitentaculata 
Hydrocoryne macrogastera 
Hydrocoryne miurensis

References

Hydrocornynidae
Hydrozoan genera